Andrzej Szymczak (8 September 1948 – 6 September 2016) was a Polish handball player who competed in the 1972 and 1976 Summer Olympics. He was born in Konstantynów Łódzki.

In 1972, Szymczak was part of the Polish team which finished tenth in the Olympic handball tournament. He played three matches as goalkeeper. Four years later, he won the bronze medal with the Polish team. He played four matches including the bronze medal match as goalkeeper.

References

External links
profile 

1948 births
2016 deaths
Polish male handball players
Handball players at the 1972 Summer Olympics
Handball players at the 1976 Summer Olympics
Olympic handball players of Poland
Olympic bronze medalists for Poland
Olympic medalists in handball
People from Pabianice County
Sportspeople from Łódź Voivodeship
Medalists at the 1976 Summer Olympics